Ex Lives is the sixth studio album by American metalcore band Every Time I Die.

Background
In early 2011, vocalist Keith Buckley went on tour with the Damned Things. Ex Lives was recorded at JOHC in Pasadena, California; producer Joe Barresi also served as an engineer, with assistance from Morgan Stratton and Sean Oakley. Barresi later mixed the recordings. Josh Newton left the band five months after the recording, and was replaced by former bassist Stephen Micciche for touring. According to Buckley, in order for him to write the lyrics to "Underwater Bimbos from Outer Space" he had to "pay attention to the defeatism that the music suggested."

Release
On January 3, 2012, Ex Lives was announced for release in March, and the album's track listing and artwork was revealed. In addition, a music video was released for "Underwater Bimbos from Outer Space", directed by Buckley. According to Blabbermouth.net, the video "features a barrage of startling visceral images which perfectly match the raging brutality of the track." Buckley said that to make the video he needed to "acknowledge the masochism I wrote of [in the lyrics] to myself. You don't get rewarded for your faith and you don't get celebrated for your heroism." On January 25, Epitaph Records began posting a series of videos to YouTube offering viewers a behind the scenes look into the making of Ex Lives.

On February 22, a music video was released for the song "Revival Mode", which was directed by Robert Schober. Buckley said the video had a "very ambiguously creepy David Lynch vibe to it" and that it features a "story line that exists outside of us as members of a band. It's dark and weird and while not completely adhering thematically to the lyrics, it sets a larger, broader mood which marries the song perfectly." Schober said the video is a "surrealist crime drama set on a lost highway...the story loosely interprets key phrases from the song...the guys were awesome and put up with many hours of freezing temperatures in the middle of the desert."

Ex Lives was made available for streaming on February 28, before being released on March 6 through Epitaph Records. In October, the band went on a tour of Australia. In January 2013, the band toured Australia as part of the Big Day Out festival.

Reception

"Ex Lives" debuted on the Billboard 200 at #20 selling around 14,300 copies. This is their highest charting position to date.

Track listing
All songs written by Every Time I Die.

Bonus tracks

Personnel
Personnel per booklet.

Every Time I Die
 Keith Buckley – vocals
 Jordan Buckley – guitar
 Andrew Williams – guitar
 Ryan "Leg$" Leger – drums
 Josh Newton – bass

Additional musician
 John Christ – high caffeine lead guitar on "Revival Mode"

Production
 Evil Joe Barresi – producer, engineer, mixing
 Morgan Stratton, Sean Oakley – assistant engineers
 Nick Pritchard – design
 Christopher Pike – photos

Chart performance

References

External links
http://blowthescene.com/reviews/every-time-i-die-ex-lives-review-and-full-stream.html

2012 albums
Every Time I Die albums
Epitaph Records albums
Albums produced by Joe Barresi